The Oneida Football Club Monument, sometimes called Football Tablet, is a monument by Joseph Coletti and installed on the Boston Common, in Boston, Massachusetts, United States.

It remembers the Oneida Football Club, the first organized team to play any kind of football in the United States. The game played by the club, known as the "Boston game", was an informal local variant that predated the codification of rules for association football, rugby football, or American football. The team, made up of students of Boston's elite preparatory schools, played on Boston Common from 1862 to 1865, during which time they reportedly never lost a game or even gave up a single point.

Overview 

The marble table was donated by seven members of the Oneida Football Club and installed in 1925. It measures approximately 6.5 ft. × 2.5 ft. × 7 in. 

An inscription on the front reads: 
ON THIS FIELD THE ONEIDA
FOOTBALL CLUB OF BOSTON
THE FIRST ORGANIZED FOOTBALL
CLUB IN THE UNITED STATES
PLAYED AGAINST ALL COMERS
from 1862 to 1865. THE ONEIDA
GOAL WAS NEVER CROSSED

This monument is placed on Boston Common
November 1925 by the seven surviving members of the Team"
An inscription on the back reads, "MEMBERS OF THE ONEIDA TEAM", with the list of the 16 members of the original team.

The monument was unveiled on Saturday November 21, 1925, and was attended by the six surviving members of the team including its founder and captain Gerritt Smith Miller.

It was surveyed by the Smithsonian Institution's "Save Outdoor Sculpture!" program in 1997.

See also

 History of soccer in the United States
 1925 in art

References

External links
 

1925 establishments in Massachusetts
1925 sculptures
Boston Common
Marble sculptures in Massachusetts
Monuments and memorials in Boston
Outdoor sculptures in Boston